The 2022 America East Women's Basketball Conference tournament was the postseason women's basketball tournament for the America East Conference that began March 5, 2022 and ended with the final on March 11, 2022. The second-seeded Albany Great Danes defeated the top seed Maine Black Bears in the tournament final to advance to the 2022 NCAA tournament, their seventh tournament appearance. All tournament games were played on the home arenas of the higher-seeded school.

Seeds 
Eight of the ten America East teams qualified for the tournament. Stony Brook was not eligible for the tournament due to a postseason ban imposed by the conference. The teams were seeded by record in conference, with a tiebreaker system to seed teams with identical conference records.

Schedule

Bracket

See also 

 2022 America East men's basketball tournament
 America East Conference women's basketball tournament

References 

2021–22 America East Conference women's basketball season
America East Conference women's basketball tournament
America East men's basketball tournament